George William Broderick O'Farrell (July 13, 1882 — September 2, 1955) was an American film and stage actor who appeared in both silent and sound films. He began his career at age 14, appearing onstage with the Baker Stock Company in his hometown of Portland, Oregon. He subsequently appeared in several locally-produced films, such as The Golden Trail (1920), before pursuing a film career in Los Angeles. He appeared in numerous silent films throughout the 1920s, and later had minor roles in several Laurel and Hardy films, including Beau Hunks (1931).

O'Farrell had minor bit parts throughout the 1940s, often appearing as conductors, doctors, and coroners in a variety of films. Some of his later credits include Mourning Becomes Electra (1947), Whispering Smith (1948), and The Girl from Jones Beach (1949). He died in Los Angeles at age 73 from a stroke.

Biography
O'Farrell was born July 13, 1882 in Portland, Oregon, and where he was a regular performer with the Baker Stock Company beginning at age 14. He appeared in various stage productions in Portland and the Pacific Northwest, including theatrical productions in Seattle and Vancouver.

He began his film career in 1920 during the silent era, appearing in locally-produced films such as the early serial short titled And Women Must Weep, in which he appeared opposite Mayo Methot. O'Farrell married Mae Norton in 1921, and had two children—a son, Kevin, and a daughter, Dawn—before separating.

He went on to appear in numerous silent pictures, followed by sound films. He appeared in several Laurel and Hardy films in minor roles, including Beau Hunks (1931). He supporting roles in numerous films, including No More Orchids (1932) with Carole Lombard, The World Accuses (1934), and the Western The Law of the 45's (1935). In the 1940s, O'Farrell primarily appeared in uncredited bit parts, being cast as butlers, coroners, and doctors. Some of his later credits include the film noir Experiment Perilous (1944), starring Hedy Lamarr; the aviation adventure film Blaze of Noon (1946), and Mourning Becomes Electra (1947).

Death
O'Farrell died in Los Angeles on September 2, 1955, of complications from a stroke. He was survived by his two children, and his second wife, Loretta Fitzpatrick. He was interred at the San Fernando Mission Cemetery.

Select filmography

References

Sources

External links

 
 Broderick O'Farrell at AFI Catalog of Feature Films
 

1882 births
1955 deaths
American film actors
American male stage actors
Catholics from Oregon
Male actors from Portland, Oregon